Maitripa College, founded in 2005 as Maitripa Institute, is a Tibetan Buddhist college located in Portland, Oregon. It is an affiliated member of the Foundation for the Preservation of the Mahayana Tradition (FPMT), an international network of Gelugpa dharma centers.

The institute's name was chosen by FPMT spiritual director, Thubten Zopa Rinpoche. It honors the eleventh century yogin Maitripa (the guru of Marpa and disciple of Naropa) who taught at the great monastic universities of Nalanda and Vikramashila.

Maitripa's founding president is Yangsi Rinpoche, a tulku and Lharampa Geshe who graduated from Sera Je (Se Rva Byas) and Gyume Tantric College. Yangsi Rinpoche is also one of the primary faculty members at the College.

Academic programs

Maitripa College identifies three pillars of its curriculum: Buddhist philosophy, meditation, and community service.

The college offers two master's degrees—an M.A. in Buddhist Studies, and a Master of Divinity. The M.A consists of 2–3 years of full-time study, culminating in a thesis or final exam. The Master of Divinity program is a 3-5 year program, depending on the rate of study, oriented towards in-depth spiritual development and professional chaplaincy. The core coursework is shared between the two programs, except for Tibetan language which is required for the M.A. but not the M.Div.

Maitripa College is a nonprofit corporation authorized by the State of Oregon (Office of Degree Authorization) to offer and confer the degrees described herein. However, it lacks regional accreditation.

Public programs
Maitripa College also offers a full schedule of public programs, including weekly dharma teachings by Yangsi Rinpoche, morning meditation, workshops and retreats that are open to the public. These feature traditional Tibetan religious teachers, scholars in the field of Buddhist Studies, and practitioners from a variety of faiths. The Public Program calendar also offers psychology workshops that are approved by the APA for continuing education credit.

References

External links
 

Asian-American culture in Portland, Oregon
Buddhist universities and colleges in the United States
Foundation for the Preservation of the Mahayana Tradition
Tibetan Buddhism in the United States
Tibetan Buddhist organizations
Universities and colleges in Portland, Oregon
Unaccredited institutions of higher learning in the United States